Can You Hear Me? may refer to:

 "Can You Hear Me?" (David Bowie song), 1974
 "Can You Hear Me" (Enrique Iglesias song), 2008
 "Can You Hear Me?" (Evermore song), 2009
 "Can You Hear Me?", a song by Charli XCX from XCX World
 "Can You Hear Me", a song by Hybrid from Disappear Here
 "Can You Hear Me? (Ayayaya)", a 2012 song by Wiley
 "Can You Hear Me" (Korn song), 2015/2019
 "Can You Hear Me", a song by Kissing the Pink (KTP) from Certain Things Are Likely
 "Can You Hear Me", a song by Mariah Carey from The Rarities
 "Can You Hear Me", a song by Missy Elliott from Under Construction
 "Can You Hear Me?", a song by Richard Fleeshman
 "Can You Hear Me", a song by Taeyeon
 Can You Hear Me? (EP), a 2013 extended play by South Korean singer IU
 "Can You Hear Me?", a song by Renaissance from Novella
 Can You Hear Me?, an album by Rick Wakeman
 Can You Hear Me? (telephone scam), a telephone scam first reported in 2017
 "Can You Hear Me?" (Doctor Who), an episode of the twelfth series of Doctor Who
 "Can You Hear Me?" (Doctors), a 2020 episode of Doctors
 Can You Hear Me? (2018 TV series), a 2018 French-Canadian television series
 Can You Hear Me? (2020 TV series), a 2020 Sri Lankan television series

See also
 Can You Hear Me Now? (disambiguation)
 "Can You Hear Me? (Ayayaya)", a 2012 song by Wiley
 "Papa, Can You Hear Me?", a 1983 song by Barbra Streisand
 "Tommy Can You Hear Me?", a song by The Who